The Man with the Getaway Face (1963) is a crime thriller novel, written by Donald E. Westlake under the pseudonym Richard Stark and published by Pocket Books. It was also published under the title The Steel Hit. It is the second of the Parker novels.

Plot
Stark's recurring character, Parker, has surgically altering his appearance to escape the mob and a contract on his life. Desperate for cash, he decides to join his old associates Skimm and Handy McKay to rob an armored car in New Jersey. Parker and Handy soon realize that the "finger" for the job, Skimm's girlfriend Alma, intends to kill Skimm and betray them. Moreover, an employee of Dr. Adler (who performed Parker's surgery) threatens to rat Parker out to The Outfit; Adler has been murdered, and Adler's employees think Parker is to blame.

Publications
The Man with the Getaway Face was re-issued by the University of Chicago Press in August 2008.

In other media

Comics
In 2010, it was adapted into a short pamphlet by cartoonist Darwyn Cooke.  This adaptation became the first chapter of Cooke's graphic novel adaptation of The Outfit, which was released later that year.

1963 American novels
American thriller novels
Novels by Donald E. Westlake
Works published under a pseudonym
Novels set in New Jersey